Hour of the Assassin (also known as ) is a 1987 action–drama film starring Erik Estrada, Robert Vaughn, Alfredo Álvarez Calderón, Orlando Sacha, Reynaldo Arenas, and Lourdes Berninzon. The film was directed by Luis Llosa Urquidi and written by Matt Leipzig. Hour of the Assassin was executive produced by Roger Corman.

Plot
Employed by a group of generals, Martin Fiero (Estrada), a former Green Beret, is hired to assassinate the newly elected President of San Pedro de Tacna, Peru. They feel threatened by the liberal sympathies of the new president-elect. The generals, having killed Fiero's father years ago, trick Fiero into thinking he is working for the leftist People's Party. Meanwhile, a CIA agent, Sam Merrick (Vaughn), is sent to stop to the assassination. It is a race against time as the agent must stop Fiero before it is too late.

Cast
 Erik Estrada as Martin Fierro
 Robert Vaughn as Sam Merrick
 Alfredo Álvarez Calderón as Ortiz
 Orlando Sacha as Folco
 Reynaldo Arenas as Paladoro
 Lourdes Berninzon as Adriana
 Ramón García as Navarro
 Oswaldo Fernández as Casals
 Ramón García Ribeyro as Andujar
 Gustavo MacLennan as Doc
 Alberto Montalva as Costa
 Francisco Giraldo as Roberto Villaverde
 Estela Paredes as Paladoro's Wife
 Javier Solís as Marcelo
 Franjo Antich as Tough Kid Motorbike
 Baldomero Cáceres as Tough Kid Castilla (credited as Baldomero Caceres)
 Maria Teresa Gagodorca as Luisa
 German Paredes as Santiago (credited as German Gonzales)

Production

Filming
Hour of the Assassin was filmed in Peru.

Release
Hour of the Assassin was released in theatres on January 23, 1987. The film was released on VHS by Warner Home Video on May 26, 1987. Hour of the Assassin was released on DVD.

See also
 List of American films of 1987

References

Sources

External links

1987 films
1987 action films
1987 drama films
Peruvian action drama films
1980s action drama films
1980s Peruvian films
1980s American films
1987 directorial debut films
English-language Peruvian films
Warner Bros. films
Films produced by Roger Corman
1980s English-language films
American action drama films